Cabo Beata is the southernmost point of the island of Hispaniola, in the Pedernales Province of the Dominican Republic. The small island of Isla Beata stands about 4 mi (7 km) southwest of the cape.

Capes of the Dominican Republic
Geography of Pedernales Province